Epsilon Psi Epsilon was the first collegiate, professional fraternity for students of Optometry. It continues today on the Ohio State University campus.

History
Epsilon Psi Epsilon was formed  at Columbia University in New York City, by three members of the first class of Optometry to be taught at Columbia. Epsilon Psi Epsilon's Founders were:
T.C. Rath
Harold Eames
Albert McConnell

From the beginning, the Fraternity's organizers sought to create a collegiate, professional fraternity, resulting in a mission statement that has been unchanged since it was written in 1911:
The Fraternity shall be known as Epsilon Psi Epsilon Fraternity, and shall have for its objectives the pursuit and cultivation of the practice of optometry and the sciences on which the same is based, together with the defense of the rights and elevation of the dignity of the optometric profession.

Dr. Rees Ellis of Alpha chapter transferred to Ohio State University, there completing his BS in Applied Optics in the class of 1923. The History of the chapter records that there were 13 charter members out of a total of 17 in the "Applied Optics" program that year. The program would later be named the School of Optometry.

At least six chapters were eventually established by the end of the Fraternity's second decade.

Closures
The Columbia chapter met its demise in 1924, thirteen years after establishment.  The Rochester chapter flourished for twelve years, but was closed with the discontinuation of the Rochester School of Optometry.

The Fraternity's History explains that "quickly evolving state rules" for optometry led to reduced student populations in some programs and even school closures, which negatively affected the expansion prospects of the fraternity.

Ohio State chapter stability
The other, younger, chapters similarly floundered, leaving only Beta chapter to carry on the Epsilon Psi Epsilon name.  But unlike the other chapters formed the Ohio State group enjoyed a very solid foundation, surviving the Great Depression serving students of a popular Optometry program at OSU and with healthy finances. Thus Beta chapter and its alumni club have for many years been the successors in all aspects to the national Fraternity.

A series of properties have served the Beta chapter, with its first home purchased at 76 East 12th Avenue in Columbus. A few years later another nearby home became available and was purchased, at 50 East 12th Avenue in Columbus. For three decades these two properties served the fraternity until it was determined to house all members in a single, even larger building.

The Fraternity's earlier properties were sold. The kitchen and common areas were remodeled in approximately 2018.

Traditions and symbols
The Fraternity's flower is the Iris.
The Fraternity's colors are Blue and White.
The Ohio State chapter publishes a quarterly journal called the O-EYE-O.
The Fraternity maintains a Vision Care Fund which allows practicing local optometrists to provide low vision equipment for up to six students annually from the Ohio State School for the Blind.

Chapters
Chapters of  include the following.  Active chapters are noted in bold, inactive chapters noted in italics.

There are presently no provisional chapters (~colonies).

Other Optometric professional fraternities 
As previously stated, optometric regulations changed rapidly, leading to abrupt opening and closing of schools during the first half of the 20th Century.

The first non-collegiate Professional Optometric Fraternity was Phi Omicron. The first collegiate Professional Optometric Fraternity was Epsilon Psi Epsilon. Other Greek Letter organizations emerging to serve the rapidly evolving field include the following, assumed to be locals and the schools where they were founded. As mergers of similar societies were common throughout the 1930s, some may have later become chapters of Epsilon Psi Epsilon:
  - Phi Omicron, professional, non-collegiate - American Association of Opticians - soon dormant
  - Epsilon Psi Epsilon, professional, collegiate - (Columbia)
  - Pi Omicron Sigma, professional, collegiate - (MSO)
  - Omega Delta, professional, collegiate - (NICO)
  - Gamma Omega Phi, professional, collegiate - (PSCO)
  - Omega Epsilon Phi, professional, collegiate - (Columbia; 10 chapters, 2,000 initiates by 1950.)
  - Phi Theta Epsilon, professional, collegiate - (PSCO)
 < - Mu Delta Pi, professional, collegiate - (Rochester SO) 
 < - Omega Pi Tau, professional, collegiate - (Rochester SO)
  - Phi Theta Upsilon, professional, collegiate - (ICOO)
  - Pi Kappa Rho, professional, collegiate - (NICO)
  - Mu Sigma Pi, professional, collegiate - (NICO)
  - Omega Beta Sigma, professional, collegiate - (LACO, TAQ)
  - Omicron Delta Epsilon, professional, collegiate - (PSCO)
  - Phi Beta Rho, women's professional, collegiate - (PSCO)
  - Phi Omicron Sigma, women's professional, collegiate - (OSU, TAQ)
  - Gamma Omicron, professional, collegiate - (SCO)

References

See also
  - Epsilon Psi Epsilon, Beta chapter website
 OSU campus portal to 
 Epsilon Psi Epsilon - Beta chapter Alumni website
 Beta Sigma Kappa
 Professional fraternities and sororities

Honor societies
Optometry
Student organizations established in 1911
1911 establishments in New York City